Carver Lake is the name of:

 Carver Lake (Washington County, Minnesota), United States
 Carver Lake, Oregon, northeast of Prouty Glacier
 Carver Lake (Ontario), Canada - see List of lakes of Ontario: C